State Route 73 (SR 73) is an east–west state highway in the southern portion of the U.S. state of Ohio. Its western terminus is on U.S. Route 27 in Oxford at the intersection of SR 732. Once SR 73 enters Scioto County, it is designated as the Scenic Scioto Heritage Trail by the Ohio Department of Transportation.

In combination with SR 32, SR 73's easternmost  are part of the quickest route between Cincinnati and Portsmouth.

Route description
The portion of SR 73 between Interstate 75 and SR 741 in Springboro is designated as the "Officer Bill Johnson Memorial Highway", in honor of William L. "Bill" Johnson, a 48-year-old, eight-year veteran of the Springboro Police Department who was struck and killed by a vehicle around 12:30 a.m. on June 27, 1983 while outside his cruiser on SR 73, investigating two people walking in the roadway.

Points of interest
Great Miami River - Middletown, Franklin
Excello Locks - Historic Remains of a lock on the Miami-Erie Canal near the intersection of 73 and S. Main St. in Middletown, Ohio. Much of the route between Trenton and Franklin follows the original path of the Miami and Erie Canal.
Middletown Historical Society Canal Museum
La Comedia Dinner Theatre - Springboro
Little Miami River - Waynesville
Little Miami Bike Trail - Corwin
Caesar Creek Lake - Warren County
Caesar Creek State Park - Warren, Clinton County
Serpent Mound
Brush Creek State Forest
Shawnee State Forest
Scioto River
Ohio River

History

1936 – Extended to Oxford.
1957 – From Excello to Franklin upgraded to 4 lanes.
1966 – From Franklin to Interstate 75 upgraded to 4 lanes.
1972 – Extended to Portsmouth (dually certified with State Route 104) along the former alignment of U.S. Route 23.
1979 – From Interstate 75 to Springboro upgraded to divided highway.
1980 – From Trenton to Excello upgraded to divided highway.
2011 – Realigned around Wilmington along a new bypass.

Major junctions

References

External links

Byways

073
Transportation in Butler County, Ohio
Transportation in Warren County, Ohio
Transportation in Clinton County, Ohio
Transportation in Highland County, Ohio
Transportation in Adams County, Ohio
Transportation in Scioto County, Ohio